Marie O'Connor is a camogie player and Garda. She played in the 2009 All Ireland camogie final. Marie is a niece of Bridie McGarry, winner of nine All- Ireland Senior medals and captain of the Kilkenny team that beat Cork in the 1987 final. Marie won a Junior All-Ireland medal in 2002 and added National League honours in 2008 when she captained Kilkenny. On the club scene she has ten county, five Leinster and three All- Ireland medals, and scored the most important goal of her career to date in the 2009 All Ireland semi-final win over Galway.

References

External links 
 Official Camogie Website
 Kilkenny Camogie Website
 https://web.archive.org/web/20091228032101/http://www.rte.ie/sport/gaa/championship/gaa_fixtures_camogie_oduffycup.html Fixtures and results] for the 2009 O'Duffy Cup
 All-Ireland Senior Camogie Championship: Roll of Honour
 Video highlights of 2009 championship Part One and part two
 Video Highlights of 2009 All Ireland Senior Final
 Report of All Ireland final in Irish Times Independent and Examiner

1984 births
Living people
Garda Síochána officers
Kilkenny camogie players